David Matthew Rose (born May 9, 1991) is an American soccer player who last played for Tampa Bay Rowdies 2 of the National Premier Soccer League.

Career

College and Amateur
Rose began his college career at the University of North Carolina at Chapel Hill.  After redshirting his freshman year, Rose made 19 appearances for the Tar Heels in 2010 and tallied one goal and one assist.  After leaving the team for unspecified reasons, he decided to finish his college soccer career at Point Loma Nazarene University, in San Diego, CA.

After redshirting in 2013 due to transfer rules, Rose made 16 appearances for the Sea Lions in 2014.  He finished the year with five goals and three assists.

Rose also played in the Premier Development League for Portland Timbers U23s.

Professional
On March 26, 2015, Rose signed a professional contract with USL club Portland Timbers 2.  He made his professional debut three days later in a 3–1 victory over Real Monarchs SLC.

Rose was announced on April 14, 2016, as a member of the initial roster for the Tampa Bay Rowdies' NPSL reserve side Rowdies 2.

References

External links
T2 bio
Point Loma Nazarene Sea Lions bio

1991 births
Living people
American soccer players
North Carolina Tar Heels men's soccer players
Portland Timbers U23s players
Portland Timbers 2 players
Association football defenders
Soccer players from North Carolina
USL League Two players
National Premier Soccer League players
USL Championship players
Tampa Bay Rowdies 2 players
People from High Point, North Carolina